The English Head Formation is a geologic formation in Quebec. It preserves fossils dating back to the Ordovician period.

See also

 List of fossiliferous stratigraphic units in Quebec

References
 

Ordovician Quebec
Ordovician southern paleotemperate deposits
Ordovician southern paleotropical deposits